The Tanjong Pagar Group Representation Constituency is a five-member Group Representation Constituency (GRC) in Central and Western Singapore. The five divisions consists: Buona Vista, Queenstown, Moulmein-Cairnhill, Tanjong Pagar-Tiong Bahru and Henderson-Dawson. The current Members of Parliament are Indranee Rajah, Chan Chun Sing, Joan Pereira, Eric Chua and Alvin Tan from the People's Action Party (PAP).

History
This GRC came into formation in 1991, when it absorbed the Tiong Bahru GRC, Telok Blangah SMC and Tanjong Pagar SMC. Since the formation of the GRC, the ward was notable for its repeated walkovers. The last walkover was in 2011 when Tanjong Pagar GRC became the only constituency to be uncontested following the disqualification of a team of independent candidates (which led by Ng Teck Siong) as they submitted their nomination papers 35 seconds late.

Town Council

Tanjong Pajar GRC is managed by the Tanjong Pajar Town Council.

Members of Parliament

Lee died on 23 March 2015 due to pneumonia. No by-elections were called as it was a GRC and Rajah served as a temporary MP for the ward until the general elections in September that year.

Electoral results

Elections in 1990s

Elections in 2000s

Elections in 2010s

Elections in 2020s

References

External links
2020 General Election's result
2015 General Election's result
2011 General Election's result
2006 General Election's result
2001 General Election's result
1997 General Election's result
1991 General Election's result
1988 General Election's result

Singaporean electoral divisions
Bishan, Singapore
Bukit Merah
Bukit Timah
Kallang
Novena, Singapore
Orchard, Singapore
Outram, Singapore
Queenstown, Singapore
Rochor
Tanglin
River Valley, Singapore
Singapore River